A molecular sieve is a material with pores (very small holes) of uniform size. These pore diameters are similar in size to small molecules, and thus large molecules cannot enter or be adsorbed, while smaller molecules can. As a mixture of molecules migrate through the stationary bed of porous, semi-solid substance referred to as a sieve (or matrix), the components of highest molecular weight (which are unable to pass into the molecular pores) leave the bed first, followed by successively smaller molecules. Some molecular sieves are used in size-exclusion chromatography, a separation technique that sorts molecules based on their size. Other molecular sieves are used as desiccants (some examples include activated charcoal and silica gel).

The pore diameter of a molecular sieve is measured in ångströms (Å) or nanometres (nm). According to IUPAC notation, microporous materials have pore diameters of less than 2 nm (20 Å) and macroporous materials have pore diameters of greater than 50 nm (500 Å); the mesoporous category thus lies in the middle with pore diameters between 2 and 50 nm (20–500 Å).

Materials
Molecular sieves can be microporous, mesoporous, or macroporous material.

Microporous material (<2 nm)
 Zeolites (aluminosilicate minerals, not to be confused with aluminium silicate)
 Zeolite LTA: 3–4 Å
 Porous glass: 10 Å (1 nm), and up
 Active carbon: 0–20 Å (0–2 nm), and up
 Clays
 Montmorillonite intermixes
 Halloysite (endellite): Two common forms are found, when hydrated the clay exhibits a 1 nm spacing of the layers and when dehydrated (meta-halloysite) the spacing is 0.7 nm. Halloysite naturally occurs as small cylinders which average 30 nm in diameter with lengths between 0.5 and 10 micrometres.

Mesoporous material (2–50 nm)
 Silicon dioxide (used to make silica gel): 24 Å (2.4 nm)

Macroporous material (>50 nm)
 Mesoporous silica, 200–1000 Å (20–100 nm)

Applications
Molecular sieves are often utilized in the petroleum industry, especially for drying gas streams. For example, in the liquid natural gas (LNG) industry, the water content of the gas needs to be reduced to less than 1 ppmv to prevent blockages caused by ice or methane clathrate.

In the laboratory, molecular sieves are used to dry solvent. "Sieves" have proven to be superior to traditional drying techniques, which often employ aggressive desiccants.

Under the term zeolites, molecular sieves are used for a wide range of catalytic applications.  They catalyze isomerisation, alkylation, and epoxidation, and are used in large scale industrial processes, including hydrocracking and fluid catalytic cracking.

They are also used in the filtration of air supplies for breathing apparatus, for example those used by scuba divers and firefighters. In such applications, air is supplied by an air compressor and is passed through a cartridge filter which, depending on the application, is filled with molecular sieve and/or activated carbon, finally being used to charge breathing air tanks. 
Such filtration can remove particulates and compressor exhaust products from the breathing air supply.

FDA approval
The U.S. FDA has as of April 1, 2012, approved sodium aluminosilicate for direct contact with consumable items under 21 CFR 182.2727. Prior to this approval Europe had used molecular sieves with pharmaceuticals and independent testing suggested that molecular sieves meet all government requirements but the industry had been unwilling to fund the expensive testing required for government approval.

Regeneration
Methods for regeneration of molecular sieves include pressure change (as in oxygen concentrators), heating and purging with a carrier gas (as when used in ethanol dehydration), or heating under high vacuum. However, some types of silica gel will "pop" when exposed to enough water. This is caused by breakage of the silica spheres when contacting the water.

Adsorption capabilities

3Å
 Approximate chemical formula: ((K2O)  (Na2O)) • Al2O3• 2 SiO2 • 9/2 H2O
 Silica-alumina ratio: SiO2/ Al2O3≈2

Production
3A molecular sieves are produced by cation exchange of potassium for sodium in 4A molecular sieves (See below)

Usage 
3Å molecular sieves do not adsorb molecules whose diameters are larger than 3 Å. The characteristics of these molecular sieves include fast adsorption speed, frequent regeneration ability, good crushing resistance and pollution resistance. These features can improve both the efficiency and lifetime of the sieve. 3Å molecular sieves are the necessary desiccant in petroleum and chemical industries for refining oil, polymerization, and chemical gas-liquid depth drying.

3Å molecular sieves are used to dry a range of materials, such as ethanol, air, refrigerants, natural gas and unsaturated hydrocarbons. The latter include cracking gas, acetylene, ethylene, propylene and butadiene.

3Å molecular sieve is utilized to remove water from ethanol, which can later be used directly as a bio-fuel or indirectly to produce various products such as chemicals, foods, pharmaceuticals, and more. Since normal distillation cannot remove all the water (an undesirable byproduct from ethanol production) from ethanol process streams due to the formation of an azeotrope at around 95.6 percent concentration by weight, molecular sieve beads are used to separate ethanol and water on a molecular level by adsorbing the water into the beads and allowing the ethanol to pass freely. Once the beads are full of water, temperature or pressure can be manipulated, allowing the water to be released from the molecular sieve beads.

3Å molecular sieves are stored at room temperature, with a relative humidity not more than 90%. They are sealed under reduced pressure, being kept away from water, acids and alkalis.

4Å
 Chemical formula: Na2O•Al2O3•2SiO2•9/2H2O
 Silica-alumina ratio: SiO2/ Al2O3≈2

Production
Production of 4Å is relatively straightforward and requires neither high pressures nor particularly high temperatures. Combine aqueous solutions of sodium silicate and sodium aluminate at 80 °C mix/agitate for a time, then "activate" by "baking" at 400 °C 4A sieves serve as the precursor to 3A and 5A sieves through cation exchange of sodium for potassium (for 3A) or calcium (for 5A)

Usage

Drying solvents
4Å molecular sieves are widely used to dry laboratory solvents.  They can absorb water and other molecules with a critical diameter less than 4 Å such as NH3, H2S, SO2, CO2, C2H5OH, C2H6, and C2H4. They are widely used in the drying, refining and purification of liquids and gases (such as the preparation of argon).

Polyester agent additives
These molecular sieves are used to assist detergents as they can produce demineralized water through calcium ion exchange, remove and prevent the deposition of dirt. They are widely used to replace phosphorus. The 4Å molecular sieve plays a major role to replace sodium tripolyphosphate as detergent auxiliary in order to mitigate the environmental impact of the detergent. It also can be used as a soap forming agent and in toothpaste.

Harmful waste treatment
4Å molecular sieves can purify sewage of cationic species such as ammonium ions, Pb2+, Cu2+, Zn2+ and Cd2+. Due to the high selectivity for NH4+ they have been successfully applied in the field to combat eutrophication and other effects in waterways due to excessive ammonium ions. 4Å molecular sieves have also been used to remove heavy metal ions present in water due to industrial activities.

Other purposes
 The metallurgical industry: separating agent, separation, extraction of brine potassium, rubidium, caesium, etc. 
 Petrochemical industry, catalyst, desiccant, adsorbent 
 Agriculture: soil conditioner
 Medicine: load silver zeolite antibacterial agent.

5Å
 Chemical formula: 0.7CaO•0.30Na2O•Al2O3•2.0SiO2 •4.5H2O
 Silica-alumina ratio: SiO2/ Al2O3≈2

Production
5A molecular sieves are produced by cation exchange of calcium for sodium in 4A molecular sieves (See above)

Usage
Five ångström (5Å) molecular sieves are often utilized in the petroleum industry, especially for the purification of gas streams and in the chemistry laboratory for separating compounds and drying reaction starting materials. They contain tiny pores of a precise and uniform size, and are mainly used as an adsorbent for gases and liquids.

Five ångström molecular sieves are used to dry natural gas, along with performing desulfurization and decarbonation of the gas. They can also be used to separate mixtures of oxygen, nitrogen and hydrogen, and oil-wax n-hydrocarbons from branched and polycyclic hydrocarbons.

Five ångström molecular sieves are stored at room temperature, with a relative humidity less than 90% in cardboard barrels or carton packaging. The molecular sieves should not be directly exposed to the air and water, acids and alkalis should be avoided.

Selecting molecular sieves 
Molecular sieves are available in different shape and sizes. But the spherical beads have advantage over other shapes as they offer lower pressure drop, are attrition resistant as they do not have any sharp edges, and have good strength, i.e. crush force required per unit area is higher. Certain beaded molecular sieves offer lower heat capacity thus lower energy requirements during regeneration.

The other advantage of using beaded molecular sieves is bulk density is usually higher than other shape, thus for same adsorption requirement molecular sieve volume required is less. Thus while doing de-bottlenecking, one may use beaded molecular sieves, load more adsorbent in same volume, and avoid any vessel modifications.

See also
 Lime (mineral)

References

External links

 Sieves Put A Lid On Greenhouse Gas
 Molecular Sieve Safety
 About Molecular Sieves

Filters
Desiccants
Vacuum
Chemical process engineering
Industrial gases
Gas technologies